Hudson is a census-designated place (CDP) in Plains Township, Luzerne County, Pennsylvania, United States. The population was 1,443 at the 2010 census.

Geography

It is located near the center of Plains Township (east of the CDP of Plains).

Demographics

References

Census-designated places in Luzerne County, Pennsylvania
Census-designated places in Pennsylvania